Roumegueriella is a genus of fungi in the class Sordariomycetes. It consists of three species.

The genus was circumscribed by Carlos Luis Spegazzini in Rev. Mycol. vol.2 on page 18 in 1880.

The genus name of Roumegueriella is in honour of Casimir Roumeguère (1828–1892), who was a French botanist and mycologist.

Species
 Roumegueriella muricospora 
 Roumegueriella pulchella 
 Roumegueriella rufula 

Former species; Roumegueriella handelii  = Neozythia handelii

References

Hypocreales genera
Bionectriaceae
Taxa described in 1880
Taxa named by Carlo Luigi Spegazzini